Pockau is a village and a former municipality in the district of Erzgebirgskreis in Saxony, Germany. On 1 January 2014 it was merged with the town Lengefeld to form the town Pockau-Lengefeld. Pockau is on the Silver Road (Silberstraße).

Geography
Originally a forest village (Waldhufendorf), Pockau is located in the valley of the Flöha at its confluence with the Black Pockau. To the north lie the one-time forest villages of Görsdorf und Forchheim, the latter in the valley of the Haselbach. To the east, in the Flöha valley, lie Wernsdorf and the settlement of Nennigmühle. To the west is the settlement of Marterbüschel. The Saidenbach Dam is northeast of Pockau.

Subdivisions

Forchheim
Görsdorf
Nennigmühle
Wernsdorf
Marterbüschel

References 

Former municipalities in Saxony
Pockau-Lengefeld